Belkin International, Inc., is an American consumer electronics and networking company headquartered in El Segundo, California. It produces mobile and computer connectivity devices and peripherals for consumer and commercial use. These include wireless chargers, power banks, charging cables, data cables, audio and video adapters, headphones, earbuds, smart speakers, screen protectors, surge protectors, Wi-Fi routers, smart home products, electronic device sanitizers, docking stations and data hubs, network switches, KVM switches and network cables.

Belkin is the parent company for Linksys and WeMo branded products and services, as well as the smart home water management company, Phyn. In 2016, Belkin was acquired by Foxconn, the largest provider of electronics manufacturing services. It now operates as an independent subsidiary.

History
While attending UCLA, Chet Pipkin, who was spending his time in local computer shops, saw the growing need for cables that would connect personal computers to new printers being released for home use. In the early 1980s, Chet Pipkin founded Belkin in his parents' home in Hawthorne, California, to manufacture computer cables for the new personal computer and tech accessory market. Pipkin began to sell computer-to-printer cables to local computer shops. As Pipkin's cable connector sales grew in Southern California, he recruited assembly help from his machinist father, brother and a handful of friends. In 1982, Pipkin left his university studies to focus on expanding the business.

On January 1, 1983, Pipkin moved into a professional workplace and hired his first full-time employees. Belkin performed its cable manufacturing in the United States, which gave the company a fast turnaround for customers. In 1985, in addition to U.S. manufacturing, Belkin began contracting Asian factories to increase production for a global market. In the 1990s, Belkin added surge protectors and USB storage devices to its product line. In the early 2000s, Belkin expanded its product line to accommodate smartphone and tablet users with hardware accessories including chargers and connector cables.

Belkin was privately run until 2002 when Summit Partners, a private equity firm, purchased a small stake in the company. Pipkin bought back those shares within the following years. In 2008, Belkin pivoted toward smartphone usage and designed new products for the smartphone accessory market.

In 2012, Belkin launched the WeMo brand to produce smart home products. In March 2013, Belkin acquired Cisco Systems' Home Networking Business Unit, including the Linksys brand and product line. In 2016, Belkin, in a joint venture with water solutions company Uponor, formed Phyn, a home water management tech brand. In September 2018, Belkin was purchased by Foxconn, a Taiwanese multinational electronics firm and the largest provider of electronics manufacturing services, for $886 million.

In January 2021, Pipkin stepped down from his role as CEO of Belkin to become the Executive Chairman of the Board. Senior Vice President and General Manager Steve Malony was announced as the new CEO.

Corporate affairs
Belkin is headquartered in El Segundo, California. Previously, the head offices were in the neighboring southern California cities of Hawthorne and Compton. The company has offices in Russia, Indonesia, Macau, Taiwan, Vietnam, China, Italy, Thailand, Philippines, Hong Kong, Japan, Korea, Brazil, Singapore, Malaysia, Greece, India, Dubai, Norway, Sweden, New Zealand, Mexico, Denmark, Spain, France, Netherlands, Germany, United Kingdom, Canada, and Australia.

From its founding in 1983 until 2012, the Belkin logo was simply the name Belkin. At Consumer Electronics Show in 2012, Belkin debuted a new logo that contains a human figure made with dots that match the dot of the "i" in Belkin. The branding team named the human figure PIP as an acronym for People-Inspired Products. In 2009, Belkin pledged to reduce 25 percent of the company's worldwide electricity consumption by 2017, and by 2018, Belkin had 37 percent reduction worldwide. Belkin made efficiency upgrades, including solar panels, EV charging stations in company parking lots, and motion sensor lighting in offices and distribution centers.

Brands
WeMo was launched in 2012 to produce smart home products that can be synced with smart devices such as Apple Homekit, Nest and Google Home.

In 2013, Belkin purchased Linksys, a Cisco network hardware company that specializes in wireless connectivity.

In 2016, Phyn, a home water management tech brand, was created by Belkin in a joint venture with water solutions company Uponor.

Between May 2013 and the end of the 2014 season, Belkin sponsored a Dutch professional cycling team, Belkin Pro Cycling Team. Belkin stepped in after the team formerly known as Rabobank lost their headline sponsor.

Belkin is involved in the local Compton community through the ASAP (Advanced Surveillance and Protection Plan) program with the LASD (LA County Sheriff's Department) and the Everybody Wins reading program. Belkin supports Susan G. Komen for the Cure to fight breast cancer through its pink ribbon iPod cases that have helped raise $350,000 for the organization. In 2007, Belkin made a holiday donation to the One Laptop per Child (OLPC) initiative.

Belkin is a founding partner and an industry partner with Da Vinci Schools, a network of charter schools with the goal of "hands-on learning," to prepare students for college and careers. In 2015, Belkin began the Belkin Internship program for the Da Vinci Extension program in which Da Vinci students gain career experiences in their community.

Products
Belkin produced its first stereo cables and speaker wiring in 2002. It markets audio products that are compatible with new technology and devices, including digital audio adapters, speakers and headphones. At CES 2019, Belkin announced the company's first headphones line, RockStar, for iPhone and Android devices. The first of the line provided headphones that are attachable to an iPhone Lightning port. In 2020, Belkin released the Soundform True Wireless Earbuds and its first speaker, the Soundform Elite Hi-Fi Smart Speaker. The Soundform Elite, created in partnership with Devialet. The speaker was named Best Smart Speaker on Rolling Stones Top Product Essentials of 2020.

Belkin also sells wall chargers, car chargers, charging stations, power banks, surge protectors, power strips, and wireless chargers for smartphones, tablets, smart watches, laptops, computers and other electronic devices.

Belkin markets a range of cables for electronic devices, including charging cables, data cables, audio/video cables, cable adapters and network cables. In its inception, Belkin focused on cables and connectors for device pairings that were not easily available in the 1980s. It released the Hamlet cable, which connected the Apple IIc computer to non-Apple printers, in 1983. In 2016, Belkin released an iPhone-compatible adapter for simultaneous iPhone charging and headphone use.

Belkin markets smart home automation products, including smart Wi-Fi light switches and plugs compatible with Google Assistant, Google Home, Nest and Apple Homekit, through its WeMo brand and water monitoring devices through its Phyn brand.

In 2020, Belkin announced the launch of a health and wellness line of products such as facemasks and electronic screen cleaning wipes.

Notes

References 

Foxconn
1983 establishments in California
Manufacturing companies based in Los Angeles
American companies established in 1983
Electronics companies established in 1983
Networking companies of the United States
Networking hardware companies
Playa Vista, Los Angeles
2018 mergers and acquisitions
American subsidiaries of foreign companies
Computer companies of the United States